Deadwood Dick is a fictional character who appears in a series of stories, or dime novels, published between 1877 and 1897 by Edward Lytton Wheeler (1854/5–1885).  The name became so widely known in its time that it was used to advantage by several men who actually resided in Deadwood, South Dakota.

Those who took the nickname included:
 Frank Palmer, gambler, according to his obituary of May 30, 1906, was the original "Deadwood Dick" who, at the age of 17 (c. 1879) went west from Springfield, Illinois, to Deadwood, South Dakota, where he made his fortune playing games of chance. He was dubbed "Deadwood Dick" by fellow gamblers. Palmer was the hero of Beadle's half-dime novels.
 Nat Love  (1854–1921), an African-American cowboy;
 Dick Brown, an actor;
 Richard Cole, a stage coach driver;
 Richard Clarke, also an actor; the Deadwood Chamber of Commerce asked him in 1927 to portray Deadwood Dick in the city's annual Days of '76 Parade. Clarke's work was managed by publicity man Bert Bell.  Among other assignments, Clarke was sent east to invite then-U.S. President Calvin Coolidge to Deadwood.  Clarke appreciated the celebrity status so much that he continued playing Deadwood Dick until his death on May 5, 1930
 Cornishman Richard Bullock, gunman and bullion guard on the Deadwood Stage (1847–1921).

Others more briefly associated with the name were Richard Palmer, who died in Cripple Creek, Colorado, in 1906, and Robert Dickey, who died in a Denver hospital jail in 1912.

The syndicated anthology television series Death Valley Days presented a 1966 episode entitled "The Resurrection of Deadwood Dick," with character actor Denver Pyle in the starring role.

References

External links
 Full-text issues of Deadwood Dick Library at Northern Illinois University

American folklore
Characters in American novels of the 19th century
Characters in pulp fiction
Literary characters introduced in 1877
Western (genre) heroes and heroines